A municipality is usually a single administrative division having corporate status and powers of self-government or jurisdiction as granted by national and regional laws to which it is subordinate.

The term municipality may also mean the governing body of a given municipality. A municipality is a general-purpose administrative subdivision, as opposed to a special-purpose district.

The term is derived from French  and Latin . The English word municipality derives from the Latin social contract  (derived from a word meaning "duty holders"), referring to the Latin communities that supplied Rome with troops in exchange for their own incorporation into the Roman state (granting Roman citizenship to the inhabitants) while permitting the communities to retain their own local governments (a limited autonomy).

A municipality can be any political jurisdiction, from a sovereign state such as the Principality of Monaco, to a small village such as West Hampton Dunes, New York.

The territory over which a municipality has jurisdiction may encompass
 only one populated place such as a city, town, or village
 several such places (e.g., early jurisdictions in the U.S. state of New Jersey (1798–1899) as townships governing several villages, municipalities of Mexico, municipalities of Colombia)
 only parts of such places, sometimes boroughs of a city, such as the 34 municipalities of Santiago, Chile.

Political powers 
Powers of municipalities range from virtual autonomy to complete subordination to the state. Municipalities may have the right to tax individuals and corporations with income tax, property tax, and corporate income tax, but may also receive substantial funding from the state. In some European countries, such as Germany, municipalities have the constitutional right to supply public services through municipally-owned public utility companies.

Terms in various countries

Municipality 

 In Brazil, municipalities are the local governments, established through state legislations. They are the smallest territorial divisions holding administrative and legislative powers in the following decrescent order: Federation/Union > State > Municipality. Colloquially, the local population uses the terms municipality and city interchangeably.

Communes 
In many countries, terms cognate with "commune" are used, referring to the community living in the area and the common interest. These include terms:

 in Romance languages, such as French  (France, French-speaking areas of Belgium and Switzerland, French-speaking countries of Africa, e.g. Benin), Italian , Romanian , and Spanish  (Chile);
 in Germanic languages such as German  (in political parlance), Swedish , Faroese , Norwegian, Danish ;
 Finnish .
 Ukrainian . 
 and Polish . 
The same terms may be used for church congregations or parishes, for example, in the German and Dutch Protestant churches.

Other terms 
In Greece, the word  is used, also meaning 'community'; the word is known in English from the compound democracy (rule of the people).

In some countries, the Spanish term , referring to a municipality's administration building, is extended via synecdoche to denote the municipality itself. In Moldova and Romania, both municipalities (municipiu; urban administrative units) and communes (rural units) exist, and a commune may be part of a municipality.

In many countries, comparable entities may exist with various names.

English-speaking 
In Australia, the term local government area (LGA) is used in place of the generic municipality. Here, the "LGA Structure covers only incorporated areas of Australia. Incorporated areas are legally designated parts of states and territories over which incorporated local governing bodies have responsibility."
In Canada, municipalities are local governments established through provincial and territorial legislation, usually within general municipal statutes. Types of municipalities within Canada include cities, district municipalities, municipal districts, municipalities, parishes, rural municipalities, towns, townships, villages, and villes among others. The province of Ontario has different tiers of municipalities, including lower, upper, and single tiers. Types of upper tier municipalities in Ontario include counties and regional municipalities. Nova Scotia also has regional municipalities, which include cities, counties, districts, or towns as municipal units.
In India, a municipality or Nagar Palika is an urban local body that administers a city of population 100,000 or more. However, there are exceptions to that, as previously municipalities were constituted in urban centers with population over 20,000, so all the urban bodies which were previously classified as municipality were reclassified as municipality even if their population was under 100,000. Under the Panchayati raj system, it interacts directly with the state government, though it is administratively part of the district it is located in. Generally, smaller district cities and bigger towns have a municipality. Municipalities are also a form of local self-government entrusted with some duties and responsibilities, as enshrined in the Constitutional (74th Amendment) Act,1992.
In the United Kingdom, the term was used until the Local Government Act 1972 came into effect in 1974 in England and Wales, and until 1975 in Scotland and 1976 in Northern Ireland, "both for a city or town which is organized for self-government under a municipal corporation, and also for the governing body itself. Such a corporation in Great Britain consists of a head as a mayor or provost, and of superior members, as aldermen and councillors". Since local government reorganisation, the unit in England, Northern Ireland and Wales is known as a district, and in Scotland as a council area. A district may be awarded borough or city status, or can retain its district title.
In Jersey, a municipality refers to the honorary officials elected to run each of the 12 parishes into which it is subdivided. This is the highest level of regional government in this jurisdiction.
 In Trinidad and Tobago, "municipality" is usually understood as a city, town, or other local government unit, formed by municipal charter from the state as a municipal corporation. A town may be awarded borough status and, later on, may be upgraded to city status. Chaguanas, San Fernando, Port of Spain, Arima and Point Fortin are the 5 current municipalities in Trinidad and Tobago.
In the United States, "municipality" is usually understood as a city, town, village, or other local government unit, formed by municipal charter from the state as a municipal corporation. In a state law context, some U.S. state codes define "municipality" more widely, from the state itself to any political subdivisions given jurisdiction over an area that may include multiple populated places and unpopulated places (see also: Local government in the United States#Municipal governments).

Chinese-speaking 
In the People's Republic of China, a direct-administered municipality (直辖市 in pinyin: zhíxiáshì) is a municipality with equal status to a province: Beijing Municipality, Chongqing Municipality, Shanghai Municipality, and Tianjin Municipality (see also: Direct-administered municipalities of China).
In the Republic of China (Taiwan), a special municipality (直轄市 in pinyin: zhíxiáshì) is a municipality with equal status to a province: Kaohsiung, New Taipei, Taichung, Tainan, Taipei, and Taoyuan (see also: Special municipality (Taiwan)).

Municipalities by country 

In Portuguese language usage, there are two words to distinguish the territory and the administrative organ. When referring to the territory, the word concelho is used, when referring to the organ of State, the word município is used. This differentiation is in use in Portugal and some of its former overseas provinces, but it's no longer in use in Brazil, where município refers to the territorial boundaries and prefeitura is its administrative organ.

See also 
Council of European Municipalities and Regions
Council–manager government
Creature of statute
Lists of municipalities
Mayor–council government
Municipal corporation
Municipal government

References

External links 

 

Types of administrative division
 Municipality
Types of populated places